Stirling is a city and former ancient burgh in Scotland, and is at the heart of the wider Stirling council area.

Stirling may also refer to:

Mathematics 
 Stirling's approximation, a formula to approximate large factorials
 Stirling number
 Stirling permutation

Physics and Engineering 
 Stirling cycle, a thermodynamic cycle for Stirling devices.
 Stirling engine, a type of heat engine. See also Applications of the Stirling engine.
 Stirling radioisotope generator, a type of radioisotope generator based on a Stirling engine.
 Advanced Stirling radioisotope generator, a power system developed at NASA's Glenn Research Center.

Places

Scotland
 Stirling (council area)
 Stirling (Scottish Parliament constituency)
 Stirling (UK Parliament constituency)
 Stirling (Parliament of Scotland constituency), which ceased to exist in 1707
 Stirling Sill, an outcropping or sill that underlies a large part of central Scotland
 Stirling Village, Aberdeenshire
 Stirlingshire, Scotland, a historic county and registration county.

Australia 
 City of Stirling, Perth
Stirling, Western Australia, a Perth suburb within the City of Stirling
Division of Stirling, electoral district in the Australian House of Representatives
 Stirling County, Western Australia
 Electoral district of Stirling, an electoral district in the Western Australian Legislative Assembly
 Stirling Range, a mountain range in southern Western Australia
 Mount Stirling, Victoria
 Stirling, South Australia, a town east of Adelaide
 Stirling, Australian Capital Territory
 Stirling, Victoria, an abandoned township near Tambo Crossing
 Stirling Park, part of Stirling Linear Park, South Australia

Canada 
 Stirling, Alberta, a village
 Stirling, a village in the township of Stirling-Rawdon, Ontario
 Stirlingville, Alberta, Canada, an unincorporated community.

New Zealand 
 Stirling, New Zealand, a settlement

Solomon Islands 
 Stirling Island

United States 
 Stirling, New Jersey, an unincorporated community
 Stirling (Massaponax, Virginia), a historic plantation
 Stirling City, California, U.S, an unincorporated community

Buildings
 Stirling Castle, Stirling, Scotland
 Stirling (Reading, Pennsylvania), a historic mansion

Schools 
 University of Stirling, Stirling, Scotland
 Stirling High School, Stirling, Scotland
 Stirling High School, East London, England
 Stirling Theological College, Carlton, Victoria, Australia
 Stirling School, Stirling, Alberta, Canada, a public school

Transportation 
 Stirling Highway, connecting Perth and Freemantle, Western Australia
 Stirling railway station (Scotland) in Stirling
 Stirling railway station, Perth in Perth, Western Australia
 MCV Stirling, a bus body
 GNR Stirling 4-2-2, a locomotive class

Military 
 Short Stirling, a Second World War British bomber aircraft
 Battle of Stirling (1648), in the Scottish Civil War
 HMAS Stirling, a Royal Australian Navy base

People 
 Stirling (surname), a surname (including a list of people with the name)
 Stirling (given name), a list of people
 Clan Stirling, a Lowland Scottish clan

Other uses 
 Earl of Stirling, an extinct title in the Peerage of Scotland
 Pound sterling, the official currency of the United Kingdom, Jersey, Guernsey, the Isle of Man, South Georgia and the South Sandwich Islands, the British Antarctic Territory, and Tristan da Cunha
 Stirling baronets, various baronetcies
 Stirling Energy Systems, an American renewable energy company
 Stirling Iron Works, the first steel producer in the colony of New York
 Stirling Prize, awarded by the Royal Institute of British Architects
 Sheriff of Stirling (12th century–1975), the office responsible for enforcing the law in Stirling, Scotland

See also
 Sterling (disambiguation)
 Stirling, Australia (disambiguation)
 Stirling Castle (disambiguation)
 Stirling County (disambiguation)